Sedat Edip Bucak (born 31 October 1960 in Siverek) is a Zaza politician and the leader of the Bucak tribe in Siverek, Şanlıurfa Province, Turkey. In the 1990s, he was a member of the Grand National Assembly of Turkey. He survived the 1996 Susurluk car crash which led to the Susurluk scandal over links between police, politicians, the Turkish mafia and the Grey Wolves. In 2004 he was convicted of involvement in the Susurluk criminal gang, overturning a previous acquittal.

Life
He was born in Siverek in 1960. His father is İsmail Hakkı.

He was elected to the Grand National Assembly of Turkey in 1991, representing Şanlıurfa for the True Path Party.

In October 1993 he held a meeting with Democracy Party (DEP) Siirt MP Zübeyir Aydar and Şırnak MP Selim Sadak. In this meeting, he declared that the state had done everything to destroy the fraternity between the Turkish and Kurdish nations. In December 1993 he organized the distribution of a leaflet entitled "Siverek Youth" in the district center of Siverek.

He was re-elected in the 1995 general election. He was the sole survivor of the Susurluk car crash in November 1996 which led to the Susurluk scandal. The other three crash victims were drug smuggler Abdullah Çatlı and his girlfriend Gonça Us, and the director of the Police Academy in Istanbul Hüseyin Kocadağ. The crashed Mercedes belonged to Bucak. Bucak's parliamentary immunity was revoked, but it was reinstated when he was re-elected in 1999, putting the Susurluk-related trial on hold. In the 1990s he was also in charge of a village guards unit of the Bucak tribe which at time 10'000 men.

Bucak failed to win a seat in the 2002 general election, and as a result he lost his parliamentary immunity, and a case against him in relation to the Susurluk gang proceeded in December 2002. In 2004 he was convicted of involvement in the Susurluk criminal gang, overturning a previous acquittal. He was sentenced to one year in prison.

References

External links
  

1960 births
Living people
People from Siverek
Turkish Kurdish politicians
Democrat Party (Turkey, current) politicians
Deputies of Şanlıurfa
Susurluk scandal
Kurdish politicians